The 2021–22 season was the 129th season in the existence of SBV Vitesse and the club's 32nd consecutive season in the top flight of Dutch football. In addition to the domestic league, Vitesse participated in this season's editions of the KNVB Cup and the inaugural UEFA Europa Conference League.

Players

First-team squad

Players out on loan

Transfers

In

Out

Pre-season and friendlies

Competitions

Overall record

Eredivisie

League table

Results summary

Results by round

Matches
The league fixtures were announced on 11 June 2021.

European competition play-offs

KNVB Cup

UEFA Europa Conference League

Third qualifying round
The draw for the third qualifying round was held on 19 July 2021.

Play-off round
The draw for the play-off round was held on 2 August 2021.

Group stage

The draw for the group stage was held on 27 August 2021.

Knockout Phase

Knockout round play-offs
The draw for the knockout round play-offs was held on 13 December 2021.

Round of 16
The draw for the round of 16 was held on 25 February 2022.

Statistics

Goalscorers

References

SBV Vitesse seasons
Vitesse
2021–22 UEFA Europa Conference League participants seasons